A Toumba is a type of archaeological site.

Toumba may also refer to:
Toumba (Thessaloniki), Greece
Toumba Stadium, Greece